Articles related to Ontario include:

0–9 
 400-series highways

A 
 Abitibi River
 Act of Union 1840
 AFL Ontario
 List of airlines of Ontario
 List of airports in Ontario
 Alcohol and Gaming Commission of Ontario
 Algoma Central Railway
 Algoma District
 Algoma Eastern Railway
 Algonquin Provincial Park
 Alzheimer Society of Ontario
 Amherstburg Freedom Museum
 Arkell Spring Grounds
 Ask Ontario
 Asperger's Society of Ontario
 Association of Iroquois and Allied Indians
 ATI Technologies
 Archaeology in Ontario
 List of Ontario area codes
 Art Gallery of Ontario
 Auditor General of Ontario

B 
 Bala Subdivision
 Bank of Hamilton
 Battle of Ontario
 Battles
 Battle of Lundy's Lane
 Battle of Queenston Heights
 Battle of the Windmill
 Battle of Windsor
 Beatty Brothers Limited
 Bell Homestead
 Berlin to Kitchener name change
 Berliner Journal
 Bibliography of Ontario
 List of birds of Ontario
 Black Donnellys
 Boat building industry in Ontario
 Boreal Shield Ecozone
 List of botanical gardens in Canada
 Brock's Monument
 Bruce County
 Bruce Nuclear Generating Station
 Bruce Peninsula
 Bytown and Prescott Railway

C 
 Cabinet of Ontario
 Camp X
 Canada Aviation and Space Museum
 Canada Company
 Canada West
 Canadian National Railway
 Canadian Pacific Railway
 Cancer Care Ontario
 Cannabis in Ontario
 List of census subdivisions in Ontario
 Central Ontario
 Canadian Forces Bases
 CFB Borden
 CFB Clinton
 CFB London
 CFB North Bay
 CFB Rockcliffe
 CFB Uplands
 Chair of Cabinet (Ontario)
 Chatham Motor Car Company
 Champlain Sea
 List of cities in Ontario
 Citizens' Assembly on Electoral Reform (Ontario)
 City Express
 Clay Belt
 Clergy Corporation
 Clergy reserve
 Coat of Arms of Ontario
 Cochrane District
 Cockshutt Plow Company
 List of colleges in Ontario
 College of Physicians and Surgeons of Ontario
 College of Physiotherapists of Ontario
 College of Psychologists of Ontario
 College of Veterinarians of Ontario
 List of communities in Ontario
 Communist Party of Ontario
 Community Living Ontario
 Conservation Authorities Act
 Conservation authority (Ontario, Canada)
 Conservation Ontario
 Constitutional Act 1791
 List of provincial correctional facilities in Ontario
 Correctional Facilities of Ontario, Canada
 List of Ontario counties
 List of county courthouses in Ontario
 Credit River

D 
 Deep Geologic Repository
 Demographics of Ontario
 Deputy Premier of Ontario
 Der Deutsche Canadier
 List of designated places in Ontario
 Dennis' Horseradish
 Diamond Estates Wines & Spirits Ltd.
 Dionne quintuplets
 Don River
 Dufferin County

E 
 Eastern Ontario
 École secondaire catholique Franco-Cité
 École secondaire catholique Franco-Cité (Nipissing)
 Economy of Ontario
 EHealth Ontario
 Electoral firsts in Canada
 Electricity policy of Ontario
 Elgin County
 List of EMS Services in Ontario
 Essex Aluminum
 Essex County
 Essex Engine Plant
 Executive Council of Ontario

F 
 Family Compact
 Family Day (Canada)
 Federal Economic Development Agency for Southern Ontario
 Federal Economic Development Initiative for Northern Ontario
 List of festivals in Ontario
 Flag of Ontario
 Foodland Ontario
 Forts
 Fort Rouillé
 Fort York
 Former counties of Ontario
 List of francophone communities in Ontario
 Franco-Ontarian
 Franco-Ontarian flag
 Freedom Party of Ontario
 Freeway Traffic Management System
 French River
 Frontenac County

G 
 Galt Subdivision
 Ganaraska Region
 List of generating stations in Ontario
 Geography of Ontario
 Geology of Ontario
 Georgian Bay
 Georgian Bay Line
 Georgian Triangle
 List of ghost towns in Ontario
 Glacial Lake Iroquois
 GO Transit
 Government of Ontario
 Golden Horseshoe
 Goldie & McCulloch
 Gooderham and Worts
 Grand River
 Grand River Railway
 Grand Trunk Railway
 Great Lakes–St. Lawrence Lowlands
 Great Seal of Ontario
 Great Western Railway (Ontario)
 Greater Toronto Area
 Green Party of Ontario
 Group of Seven (artists)

H 
 Haldimand Proclamation
 Haldimand Tract
 Haliburton Forest
 Happy Valley Forest
 History of Ontario
 History of Ottawa
 History of Prescott, Ontario
 Hudson Plains Ecozone
 Hummingbird Ltd.
 Huron County
 Huron Tract
 Huronia
 Hurricane Hazel
 Hyslop and Ronald

I 
 Imperial Towers
 Imprisonment for debt (Upper Canada)
 Independent Telecommunications Providers Association
 List of islands of Ontario

J 
 Josiah Henson Museum of African-Canadian History

K 
 Kaufman Footwear
 Kenora District
 The Killam Trusts
 Killarney Provincial Park
 Kingsbridge Wind Power Project
 Kingston Shipyards

L 
 La Cloche Mountains
 Labor-Progressive Party
 Ladies Ontario Hockey Association
 Lake Erie
 Lake Erie and Northern Railway
 Lake George
 Lake Huron
 Lake Manitou
 Lake Nipissing
 Lake Ontario
 Lake St. Clair
 Lake Simcoe
 Lake Superior
 Lambton County
 Landlord and Tenant Board
 Law Union of Ontario
 Legislative Assembly of Ontario
 Libertarian Party of Ontario
 Liquor Control Board of Ontario
 Liquor Licence Board of Ontario
 List of lakes in Ontario
 List of Lieutenant Governors of Ontario
 List of Ontario expressways
 List of Ontario general elections
 List of Ontario Parks
 List of Ontario Parliaments
 List of Ontario premiers
 List of Ontario provincial highways
 List of Ontario school boards
 List of protected areas of Ontario

M 
 Manitoulin District
 Manitoulin Island
 McCrae House
 Member of Provincial Parliament (Ontario)
 Metrolinx
 Mid-Canada Communications
 Ministry of Agriculture, Food and Rural Affairs (Ontario)
 Ministry of Citizenship, Immigration and International Trade
 Ministry of Education (Ontario)
 Ministry of Energy, Northern Development and Mines
 Ministry of the Environment, Conservation and Parks
 Ministry of Finance (Ontario)
 Ministry of Francophone Affairs
 Ministry of Government and Consumer Services (Ontario)
 Ministry of Health (Ontario)
 Ministry of Health Promotion and Sport (Ontario)
 Ministry of Indigenous Affairs (Ontario)
 Ministry of Infrastructure (Ontario)
 Ministry of Intergovernmental Affairs (Ontario)
 Ministry of Long-Term Care (Ontario)
 Ministry of Municipal Affairs and Housing (Ontario)
 Ministry of Natural Resources and Forestry
 Ministry of Seniors and Accessibility
 Ministry of Transportation of Ontario
 Mississaugas
 Mississaugas of the Credit First Nation
 Mixedwood Plains Ecozone
 Mnjikaning Fish Weirs
 Mohawk Chapel
 Monarchy in Ontario
 List of municipalities in Ontario
 Municipal Property Assessment Corporation
 List of museums in Ontario

N 
 NABU Network
 Natural Law Party of Ontario
 Neutral Nation
 Niagara Escarpment
 Niagara Falls
 Niagara Glen Nature Reserve
 Niagara Peninsula
 Niagara River
 Nickel Belt
 Nipigon Embayment
 Nipissing District
 Nortel
 Northern Ontario
 Northern Ontario Heritage Fund
 Northern Ontario Natural Gas
 Northern Railway of Canada
 Northeastern Ontario
 Northwestern Ontario
 Nuclear Power Demonstration

O 
 Oak Ridges Moraine
 Obabika Old-Growth Forest
 Obabika River Provincial Park
 Office of the Fairness Commissioner
 ONroute
 Ontario Archaeological Society
 Ontario Arts Foundation
 Ontario Association of Art Galleries
 Ontario Basic Income Pilot Project
 Ontario Blue Cross
 Ontario College of Certified Social Workers
 Ontario College of Family Physicians
 Ontario Cottage
 Ontario Court of Appeal
 Ontario Disability Support Program
 Ontario Drama Festival
 Ontario's Drive Clean
 Ontario Energy Board
 Ontario Fault Determination Rules
 Ontario Federation of Labour
 Ontario Film Review Board
 Ontario Gazette
 Ontario Geological Survey
 Ontario government debt
 Ontario Handweavers & Spinners
 Ontario Health (agency)
 Ontario Health Coalition
 Ontario Health Insurance Plan
 Ontario Heritage Trust
 Ontario Hockey League
 Ontario Hospital Association
 Ontario Human Rights Commission
 Ontario Legislative Building
 Ontario Liberal Party
 Ontario Lottery and Gaming Corporation
 Ontario Malleable Iron Company
 Ontario March of Dimes
 Ontario Medal for Good Citizenship
 Ontario Medical Association
 Ontario Ministry of Citizenship and Immigration
 Ontario Municipal Board
 Ontario New Democratic Party
 Ontario Northland Motor Coach Services
 Ontario Northland Railway
 Ontario Northland Transportation Commission
 Ontario (Old Order) Mennonite Conference
 Ontario Parliament Network
 Ontario Power Generation
 Ontario Provincial Police
 Ontario Rugby League
 Ontario Savings Bond
 Ontario Science Centre
 Ontario Securities Commission
 Ontario Sire Stakes
 Ontario Software Acquisition Program Advisory Committee
 Ontario Sports Hall of Fame
 Ontario Telephone Service Commission
 Ontario Temperance Act
 Ontera
 Order of Ontario
 Oshawa Car Assembly
 Ottawa
 Ottawa Car Company
 Ottawa River
 Ottawa River Waterway
 Ottawa Safety Council
 Ottawa Valley
 Ottawa-Bonnechere Graben
 Outline of Ontario
 Outstanding Ontario Library Award

P 
 Parry Sound District
 Patrons of Industry
 Pedlar People Limited
 Peterborough Canoe Company
 Petun
 Petworth Emigration Scheme
 Pickering Nuclear Generating Station
 Pinery Provincial Park
 List of Canadian poets
 Poet Laureate of Ontario
 Point Pelee National Park
 Poverty in Ontario
 List of population centres in Ontario
 Port Alma Wind Farm
 Premier of Ontario
 Premier's Awards for Excellence in the Arts
 Prescott, Ontario
 Preston Car Company
 Progressive Conservative Party of Ontario
 Protestant Protective Association
 Province of Canada
 Provincial Secretary and Registrar of Ontario
 Pseudo Interactive
 Public drinking in Ontario
 List of public libraries in Ontario
 Pure Spring Company

Q 
 Quebec City–Windsor Corridor
 Québec City–Windsor Corridor (Via Rail)
 Queen's Park
 Queen's Printer for Ontario

R 
 List of radio stations in Ontario
 Rainy River District
 Real Estate Council of Ontario
 Red Tape Commission
 Reform movement (Upper Canada)
 Reform Party of Ontario
 Rent control in Ontario
 Research Enterprises Limited
 Responsible government
 Rideau Canal
 Ring of Fire (Northern Ontario)
 Ringette
 Royal Canadian Mint
 Royal eponyms in Canada
 The Royal Hamilton Light Infantry (Wentworth Regiment)
 Royal Military College of Canada
 Royal Ontario Museum

S 
 St. Clair River
 Saint Lawrence River
 Sainte-Marie among the Hurons
 Same-sex marriage in Ontario
 Sault Ste. Marie language resolution
 Schizophrenia Society of Ontario
 Schneider Haus
 Seagram
 Shaw Media
 Sheguiandah
 Short Hills Provincial Park
 Simcoe County
 Six Nations of the Grand River
 Social Contract (Ontario)
 Social Credit Party of Ontario
 Socialist Party of Ontario
 Southern Ontario
 Southern Ontario Library Service
 Southwest Elgin Forest Complex
 Southwestern Ontario
 Southwestern Ontario English
 Southwold Earthworks
 Stonehooking
 Sudbury District
 Sudbury–White River train
 Sun Valley Gardens
 Superior Court of Justice for Ontario

T 
 List of television stations in Ontario
 TFO
 Thames River
 The Law Society of Upper Canada
 The Beer Store
 Thunder Bay District
 Thunder Bay (landform)
 Timeline of Ontario history
 Timmins—James Bay
 Toronto
 Toronto Harbour
 Toronto Pearson International Airport
 Toronto Union Station
 Toronto–Sarnia train
 List of towns in Ontario
 List of township municipalities in Ontario
 TVOntario

U 
 Ultra Food & Drug
 Unemployment in Ontario
 List of unincorporated communities in Ontario
 United Farmers of Ontario
 List of universities in Ontario
 Upper Canada
 Upper Canada Rebellion
 Upper Canada Village

V 
 Value-added wood products in Ontario
 Valu-mart
 Vehicle registration plates of Ontario
 List of villages in Ontario

W 
 Walkerton E. coli outbreak
 Waterfront Trail
 War of 1812
 Welland Canal
 Wellington County
 Wellington District
 Wellington, Grey and Bruce Railway
 Western Fair
 Western Fair Museum and Archives
 Wheatley Provincial Park
 Windsor Assembly
 Windsor Salt Mine
 Windsor Transmission
 Woodside National Historic Site
 Workplace Safety and Insurance Board

X

Y 
 Ontario Youth Parliament

Z 
 Zehrs Markets
 Zellers

See also

 Index of Canada-related articles

Ontario